Vomito negro may refer to:

 An alternative name for the acute viral disease yellow fever
 A Belgian band, see Vomito Negro (band)